The Christian Economic Opposition Party (KGEP) was a political party in Hungary during the 1930s.

History
The party first contested national elections in 1931, winning a single seat in the parliamentary elections that year. It did not contest any further elections.

References

Defunct political parties in Hungary
Christian political parties in Hungary